BBC Sessions 1969–1972 (Sampler) is a compilation album by David Bowie, released in 1996. This release is notable for the inclusion of "I'm Waiting for the Man" in a different BBC session take to the version released on Bowie at the Beeb.

Track listing
All songs written by David Bowie except "Waiting For the Man" by Lou Reed.
"Hang on to Yourself" – 2:50
"Ziggy Stardust" – 3:19
"Space Oddity" – 4:15
"Andy Warhol" – 2:53
"Waiting For the Man" – 4:50
"Interview With Brian Matthew" – 1:27
"Let Me Sleep Beside You" – 2:42

Notes

References

BBC Radio recordings
David Bowie compilation albums
Sampler albums
1996 compilation albums
David Bowie live albums
1996 live albums